Kleiner Dörnberg, also known as Zierenberger Kuppe, is a mountain of Hesse, Germany.

Mountains of Hesse